WUKQ may refer to:

 WUKQ (AM), a radio station (1420 AM) licensed to serve Ponce, Puerto Rico, which simulcasts WKAQ
 WUKQ-FM, a radio station (99.1 FM) licensed to serve Mayaguez, Puerto Rico, which simulcasts WKAQ-FM
 WEPN (AM), a radio station (1050 AM) licensed to serve New York, New York, United States, which used the call sign WUKQ from October 1988 to February 1989